Ramanamudalipudur is a town situated in Coimbatore rural district, in the state of Tamil Nadu, India.

Geography
The town of Ramanamudalipudur exists near an abundant supply of wildlife. Animals like panthers, crocodiles, tigers, elephants, spotted deer, civet cats, and wild boars are found in the region. Numerous birds can also be sighted in the area. It is possible to spot such birds as the Malabar pied hornbill, black headed oriole, rocket-tailed drongo, tree pie, spotted dove, and red whiskered bulbul. In fact, the very name of this town invokes thoughts of wildlife, since the name's translation means elephant hill.

Located in the Coimbatore Hills district in the state of Tamil Nadu, the biggest draw for tourists in this area is the remarkable beauty of the natural landscape that is there. Many different shades of green make up the dense forest of this area. The town itself also has some incredibly interesting history.

Ramanamudalipudur is one of the eight sacred Jaina hills. Right by the village there is a natural cavern that contains numerous berths that are located both inside and outside of it. There is a Brahmi inscription on the outside wall that is dated back to the 1st or 2nd century. This inscription states that the berths were gifts from Nathan of Kunrattur made in honor of three monks named Eri Aritan, Attuvay, and Arrattakayipan. This is a rather unusual find since this village was not known for being a lama center until the 9th century. It was around that time that several stone sculptures started to be carved into the rocks by devout local people

Climate

Ramanamudalipudur climate is quite moderate.

Summers (March to May) are bit hot with maximum temperature lies between 35 °C to 40 °C.
However, this season is good for exploring the forest wildlife. Monsoons [June to September] are accompanied with medium to heavy rainfalls owing to southwest and northeast monsoons. Post-monsoons [October to November] offer maximum rainfalls in Ramanamudalipudur, the forests looks beautiful during rainy seasons. Winters (December to February) have an average temperature of about 20 °C, with minimum not going below 15 °C.

Best season to visit Ramanamudalipudur is June to March, tourists may avoid heavy rainy days.

March to May Sanctuary may be closed and the season is good for other sight seeing.
June to September is good for nature viewing and also to spot wild animals.
October to November is heavy rainy season, only suitable for short trips.
December to February is highly pleasant and excellent for all tourist activities.

Religion
There are many temples in Ramanamudalipudur

Transportation
Bus service is available from Pollachi to Ramanamudalipudur. They are S. B. S 17 & CTC 17.

Education
School

Politics

Panchayath Details

Details of Ex.Panchayath President

See also 
Anaimalai Hills

References 

Villages in Coimbatore district